Bahiria maytenella is a species of snout moth. It was described by Hiroshi Yamanaka in 2004. It is found in Japan (it was described from Okinawa).

References

, 2004: Two new species, three unrecorded species, and three new synonyms of the  Phycitinae from Japan (Pyralidae). Tinea 18 (3): 184–191.

Moths described in 2004
Phycitini
Moths of Japan